Kokborok tei Hukumu Mission was formed on 10 August 1993, in Agartala, Tripura, India as a non-political, non-religious organization whose sole mission is to serve to promote to develop and to preserve the Tripuri literature, culture, tradition and its heritage.

Activities
A number of Seminar, Workshop, Deputation, Literary Meet and Research works have been organized by KOHM.

National
The members of the KOKBOROK TEI HUKUMU MISSION has been invited as Informant of the Kokborok for M.A. final year of 2003 in the Department of Linguistics, University of Delhi, New Delhi, India. The Kokborok has been discussed in a length and the Linguists from the University had remarked the Kokborok as one of the rich language in the world. About 19 students from the different countries of India, Sri Lanka, Bangladesh, Yemen, Thailand and Vietnam have attended the classes.

Radio
Beside of these, the members of the KOKBOROK TEI HUKUMU MISSION has conducting Kokborok programs in All India Radio, Agartala since April 1995.

International
The KOKBOROK TEI HUKUMU MISSION has also step up in the International arena.

 Paper submitted in the 4th International Symposium on Languages and Linguistics, PAN-ASIATIC LINGUISTICS held on 8–10 January 1996 at Institute of Language and Culture for Rural Development, Mahidol University at Salaya, Bangkok, THAILAND. Paper entitled - THE KOKBOROK IS ONE OF THE RICH LANGUAGE IN THE WORLD.
 Paper submitted in the 5th International Symposium on Languages and Linguistics, PAN-ASIATIC LINGUISTICS held on 16–18 November 2000 AD organized by the Vietnam National University at Ho Chi Minh City, VIETNAM. Paper entitled - THE KOKBOROK IS THE LANGUAGE OF BOROK PEOPLE IN TWIPRA INDIA - A BRIEF OUTLINE.

Major publications
Simultaneously the publication of Kokborok and other books had also been done and about 36 (thirty six) titles been published from its formation.

Kokborok Dictionary
KOHM is the publisher of the authoritative Dictionary in the Kokborok language, compiled by Binoy Debbarma in two editions. Anglo-Kokborok-Bengali Dictionary (2nd edition with Bengali), 2002.

See also
 Kokborok Sahitya Sabha

External links
 kohm.twipra.com official website hosted by twipra.com

Kokborok
Tripuri culture